Aleksei Vladimirovich Dudin (born 13 May 1977) is a former Russian football player.

Dudin played in the Russian Premier League with FC KAMAZ Naberezhnye Chelny.

References

1977 births
Living people
Russian footballers
FC KAMAZ Naberezhnye Chelny players
Russian Premier League players
Association football defenders
FC Rubin Kazan players
FC Neftekhimik Nizhnekamsk players